Mallee Region may refer to:

 Mallee (biogeographic region), a biogeographic region in southern Western Australia
 The Mallee, a region in northwest Victoria, Australia